Lasse Heje Pedersen (born October 3, 1972) is a Danish financial economist known for his research on liquidity risk and asset pricing. He is Professor of Finance at the Copenhagen Business School. Before that, he held the position of a Professor of Finance and Alternative Investments at the New York University Stern School of Business. He has also served in the monetary policy panel and liquidity working group at the Federal Reserve Bank of New York and is a principal at AQR Capital Management.

He was the winner of the 2011 Germán Bernácer Prize, awarded annually to the best European economist under the age of 40, for his original research contributions on how the interaction between market liquidity risk and funding liquidity risk can create liquidity spirals and systemic financial crises.

Education and academic career
After completing his bachelor's and master's degrees  in mathematics and economics at the University of Copenhagen in 1997, he went to Stanford University Graduate School of Business where he earned a Ph.D. in Finance in 2001, advised by Darrell Duffie and Kenneth Singleton. Upon graduation he started as assistant professor at the New York University Stern School of Business where he got tenure in 2005 and held the position of John A. Paulson Professor of Finance and Alternative Investments from 2009 to 2014. He is currently Distinguished Visiting Research Professor at NYU and, since 2011, Professor of Finance at Copenhagen Business School.

His research has been cited by central bankers such as Fed Chairman Ben Bernanke and in the press, including The Economist, The New York Times,
Forbes,
and The Financial Times''.

Work on market and funding liquidity risk
Lasse H. Pedersen's research shows that investors need to be compensated for incurring trading costs and the risk of rising trading costs. Therefore, securities with higher market liquidity risk have higher required return, as per the liquidity-adjusted CAPM.

Further, many investors face funding constraints (e.g., leverage constraints and margin requirements), and funding liquidity problems affect security prices. Funding constraints raise the required return for securities with high margin requirements  or low risk.

His research shows how the interaction between market and funding liquidity risk can create  liquidity spirals and liquidity crises. Liquidity problems affect the macro economy and imply that monetary authorities can manage leverage and margin requirements as a second monetary tool.

References

External links
Homepage at NYU Stern
Private homepage

1972 births
Danish economists
Living people
Academic staff of Copenhagen Business School
New York University faculty
University of Copenhagen alumni
Stanford University alumni